Steven James Meo is a Welsh television actor from Coelbren in the Swansea Valley in Wales. He is known for his roles in BBC Wales sitcom High Hopes (2002–2008), BBC Three series Grownups (2006–2009), and BBC Wales drama series Belonging (1999–2009). 

Meo has also portrayed the roles of Owain Hughes in the third series of Gavin & Stacey, Josh in the Torchwood episode "Random Shoes" (2006), and participated in The Big Welsh Challenge on BBC Wales. 

He was the last Thénardier of the original Royal Shakespeare Company version of Les Misérables in London's West End, and is an Associate Artist at Clwyd Theatre Cymru. 

In February 2021, he appeared in the ITV drama The Pembrokeshire Murders alongside actors Luke Evans and Keith Allen. In April 2021, he appeared in an episode of the BBC soap opera Doctors. He appears in the Sky Comedy "Code 404" as series regular DI Paul Stokes, alongside Stephen Graham and Daniel Mays.

Personal life
Meo attended Maesydderwen Comprehensive School in Ystradgynlais in the Swansea Valley, in the year above actress Eve Myles. Afterwards, he trained in Cardiff at the Royal Welsh College of Music and Drama. Steven got engaged to actress Eleanor Howell in New York in 2010, whilst he was performing the play Pieces on Broadway, and they were married in Tetbury in 2012. They have two sons together.

Filmography

References

External links 
 

21st-century Welsh male actors
Living people
Male actors from Swansea
Welsh male soap opera actors
Welsh male television actors
Year of birth missing (living people)